Barry Powell may refer to:

Barry Powell (footballer) (born 1954), English footballer
Barry B. Powell (born 1942), American professor and author
Barry Powell, administrator of Malew